The 2011 Stroud Council election was held 6 May to elect members of the Stroud District Council in England. Candidates in four parties campaigned for one of eighteen seats. The Labour Party won seven of the seats up for grabs, the highest of any single party in this election.

Election result

Ward results

References

2011 English local elections
2011
2010s in Gloucestershire